Gladstone is a defunct electoral district that elected members to the House of Assembly, the lower house of the bicameral legislature of the then colony of South Australia.

As of 1884, its extent included the following towns - Crystal Brook,  Gladstone,  Georgetown,
Laura and Merriton.

Members

References

Former electoral districts of South Australia
1884 establishments in Australia
1902 disestablishments in Australia